The translation convention is a filmic and television storytelling device in which the characters within a fictional story are heard or seen speaking not their native language but instead the language of the film's audience, which is pretended to be their native languages. Sometimes, some or all of the characters speak with an accent that reflects the actual language spoken in the fictional or historical story setting.

This concept has been used since the beginning of narrative sound film. It uses, among other things, a degree of suspension of disbelief.

See also
Dramatic convention
Practice of dubbing foreign films

References

Narrative techniques
Cinematic techniques
Translation